Mangshan ( 芒山, literally "Mount Máng") or mangshanensis may refer to:

 Mangshan District (芒山区), a former district  of Zhengzhou, Henan, China
 Mangshan (芒山镇), a town in Yongcheng District, Shangqiu, Henan, China, see List of township-level divisions of Henan
 Mangshan (芒山) the ancient burial ground hill in Zhongtou Village, Luoyang, Henan, China, now the site of the Luoyang Ancient Tombs Museum
 Mangshan National Nature Reserve, a protected area of Hunan Province, China, see List of protected areas of China
 Mangshanyegan, the Mangshan mandarin (Citrus nobilis Lauriro), a wild citrus fruit species native to Mangshan, Hunan Province, China, morphologically similar to cultivated Mandarin oranges, but of a different species